The Whitefish River is a  river in Census division No. 18 in northern Saskatchewan, Canada. It is in the Hudson Bay and Churchill River drainage basins.

Course
The waters of Rowe Lake flow through Shadd Lake to Black Bear Island Lake on the Churchill River.

See also 
List of rivers of Saskatchewan
Hudson Bay drainage basin

References

Rivers of Saskatchewan
Tributaries of Hudson Bay